Ivan Nedelkov Shablin (also known as "N. Shablin") (1881 - 1925) was a Bulgarian political activist.

Life
Ivan Shablin was born on January 4, 1881, in the city of Radomir. He graduated from the Telegraph School. He became a member of the Bulgarian Social Democratic Workers' Party (Narrow Socialists) in 1897.

He worked as a telegraphist. For his involvement in the Transport Strike (1919-1920) he was fired.

He took part in the Bulgarian Workers' Social Democratic Party  before becoming a founder member of the Bulgarian Communist Party in 1919. After the St Nedelya Church assault in 1925, the Bulgarian police murdered him, perhaps by burning him alive.

See also
 List of delegates of the 2nd Comintern congress

References

1925 deaths
1881 births
20th-century Bulgarian politicians
Bulgarian communists
Prisoners who died in Bulgarian detention